Geoffrey Dunn is an American author, film producer, film director, screenwriter, and investigative journalist. His films include Calypso Dreams, Miss…or Myth?,  Dollar a Day, 10¢ a Dance and his books include, The Lies of Sarah Palin: The Untold Story Behind Her Relentless Quest for Power,
Chinatown Dreams, and Santa Cruz is in the Heart, Volumes l and ll.

The Lies of Sarah Palin: The Untold Story Behind Her Relentless Quest for Power, written by Dunn in 2011, remained on Amazon's bestsellers list for more than a year and a half.

Early life and education
Geoffrey Frank Dunn was born in San Francisco, California, to parents Frank and Lindy (née Stagnaro) Dunn. He is a fourth-generation descendant of the Stagnaro fishing family from Riva Trigoso, Italy.  
Dunn graduated from Soquel High School in 1973, where he was captain of his high school baseball team. He received his B.A. in politics with honors in the major and college honors from the  University of California, Santa Cruz in 1977. He received an MA and Ph.D. in sociology from the University of Santa Cruz.

Career

Filmmaking 
Dunn began his film career serving as the on-screen narrator in the documentary film, A Day on the Bay in 1980. He later partnered with his principal collaborator Mark Schwartz on several documentary films, including Dollar a Day, 10¢ a Dance; Miss…or Myth? (nominated for the Grand Jury Prize at Sundance, 1988), Mi Vida: The Three Worlds of Maria Gutierrez, Chinese Gold, and Calypso Dreams. He wrote the original screenplay for the feature film Maddalena Z (1989), which was released by Millennium Entertainment as Voyage of the Heart (1990), produced and directed by Schwartz.

Writing 
Dunn was a featured contributor to the HuffPost (formerly The Huffington Post) and served as senior editor for Metro Newspapers where he received awards for investigative journalism from the National Newspaper Association, the California Newspaper Publishers Association, and the Peninsula Press. During the 2000s, he wrote numerous articles on Caribbean Culture for the Trinidad Express Newspapers, including a poem, a response to Nobel Prize-winning poet Derek Walcott's Return of the Spoiler, entitled Sparrow Come Back.

Awards 
Dunn has been the recipient of numerous awards for his work in film, journalism, teaching, and community work. He received an Excellence in Teaching award from the University of California, Santa Cruz in 2000, the Gail Rich Award for Outstanding Contribution to the Arts in 2002, a Lifetime Achievement Award from the Santa Cruz Chamber of Commerce in 2011, and was awarded the Santa Cruz County Artist of the Year award in Santa Cruz, California in 2015. Dunn received the Tony Hill Community Service award from the University of California, Santa Cruz in 2020 in recognition of Outstanding Community Service and Commitment to Building Bridges Among Diverse Groups, which was recognized at the UC Santa Cruz annual Martin Luther King Jr. Convocation.

Filmography
 2015 - The Glamour Boyz Again: The Mighty Sparrow and Lord Superior on the Hilton Rooftop - Director, co-producer, writer 
 2008 - Calypso Dreams - Writer, co-producer, co-director
 1993 - A Home Movie Scrapbook - Writer, Director
 1989 - Voyage of the Heart—Maddalena Z - Screenwriter, Actor
 1987 – Mi Vida: The Three Worlds of Maria Gutierrez - Writer, co-director
 1987 - Chinese Gold - Writer, co-director 
 1986 - Miss...or Myth? - Writer, co-director
 1984 - Dollar a Day, 10¢ a Dance - Writer, co-director
 1981 - A Day on the Bay

Books
 2016 – Santa Cruz Wharf 
 2014 - Santa Cruz is in the Heart 
 2013 – Sports of Santa Cruz County 
 2013 - Vintage Bargetto: Celebrating a Century of California Wine  (co-author)
 2011 - The Lies of Sarah Palin: The Untold Story Behind Her Relentless Quest for Power
 2002 - Chinatown Dreams: The Life and Photographs of George Lee 
 1989 - Santa Cruz is in the Heart (2nd edition 1990, 3rd edition 1995, 4th edition 1998, 5th edition 2003)

References

American male journalists
20th-century American novelists
American travel writers
American male novelists
Year of birth missing (living people)
Living people